This is a list of names connected with primal living, wilderness adventure, and challenge-based education.

Notes and references

Adventure